The 2012 Canadian Championship (officially the Amway Canadian Championship for sponsorship reasons) was a soccer tournament hosted and organized by the Canadian Soccer Association that took place in the cities of Edmonton, Montreal, Toronto and Vancouver in 2012. As in the previous tournament, participating teams included FC Edmonton, Montreal Impact, Toronto FC and Vancouver Whitecaps FC. It was won by Toronto FC, who defeated the Vancouver Whitecaps 2-1 on aggregate in the final round. As the winner, Toronto FC took the Voyageurs Cup and Canada's entry into the Group Stage of the 2012–13 CONCACAF Champions League. It was the fifth edition of the annual Canadian Championship.

Qualified teams

Matches

Bracket
The teams were seeded based on 2011 league results, with the Major League Soccer teams receiving the No. 1 and No. 2 seeds, and the North American Soccer League teams receiving the No. 3 and No. 4 seeds.
Each round is a two-game aggregate goal series.

Semifinals

Toronto FC won 2–0 on aggregate.

Vancouver Whitecaps FC won 5–1 on aggregate.

Final

Toronto FC won 2–1 on aggregate.

References

2012 domestic association football leagues
2012 in Canadian soccer
2012
2012–13 CONCACAF Champions League